The Akureyri Art Museum (regionally also ) was founded in 1993.  The museum is located in the center of Akureyri, the second-largest city in Iceland.  Originally home to a dairy, the building which houses the gallery is noted as a good example of the Bauhaus school of architecture.

Artists that have had their work displayed in the Akureyri Art Museum include Icelandic artists Erró, Kjarval and Louisa Matthíasdóttir, American artist Spencer Tunick, Israeli video artist Guy Ben-Ner and French photographer Henri Cartier-Bresson.

The museum has been host to the Icelandic Visual Arts Awards since 2006, when they were first given.

References

External links 

 
 Akureyri Art Museum on Flickr

Art museums established in 1993
Art museums and galleries in Iceland
Buildings and structures in Akureyri
1993 establishments in Iceland